Boxing will be competed as one of the nine sports at the 2015 Commonwealth Youth Games in the Apia from September 5 to 11, 2015, in the Tuana’imato Sports Facility, Apia. The event is only open to boys. In the Games, the age limit for participating athletes has been set according to the youth category of the International Boxing Association, which is 17–18 years, means athletes born in 1997 or 1998 are only eligible to take part.

Medal summary

References

External links

2015 in boxing
2015 Commonwealth Youth Games